The superfamily Papilionoidea (from the genus Papilio, meaning "butterfly") contains all the butterflies except for the moth-like Hedyloidea.

The members of the Papilionoidea may be distinguished by the following combination of characters:
The body is smaller and less moth-like.
The wings are larger.
The antennae are straight and clubbed or hooked as in the skippers.
The caterpillars do not spin cocoons in which to pupate.
The pupae are angular rather than rounded.

Recent phylogenetic analyses suggest the traditionally circumscribed Papilionoidea are a paraphyletic group, and that skippers (family Hesperiidae) and Neotropical moth-like butterflies (family Hedylidae) are true butterflies that should be included within the Papilionoidea superfamily to reflect cladistic relationships.

Families of Papilionoidea
The six well-supported families of Papilionoidea are:
 Hesperiidae (skippers)
Swallowtails and birdwings, Papilionidae
Whites or yellow-whites, Pieridae
Blues and coppers or gossamer-winged butterflies, Lycaenidae
Metalmark butterflies, Riodinidae
Brush-footed butterflies, Nymphalidae which contain the following 13 subfamilies:
 The snout butterflies or Libytheinae (formerly the family Libytheidae)
 The danaids or Danainae (formerly the family Danaidae)
 The Tellervinae
 The glasswings or Ithomiinae
 The Calinaginae
 The morphos and owls or Morphinae (including the owls as tribe Brassolini)
 The browns or Satyrinae (formerly the family Satyridae)
 The Charaxinae (preponas and leaf butterflies)
 The Biblidinae
 The Apaturinae
 The nymphs or Nymphalinae
 The Limenitidinae (especially the adelphas)
 The tropical longwings or Heliconiinae

Of the subfamilies of Nymphalidae, only the Morphinae and Satyrinae are possibly paraphyletic, but these two subfamilies form a strongly supported clade with the Charaxinae as sister group.

The fossil genus Lithopsyche is apparently a Papilionoidea incertae sedis, which has long been mistaken for a geometer moth of the Boarmiini. It is variously placed in the Lycaenidae or Riodinidae. A similar fossil, Lithodryas, is more firmly assigned to the Lycaenidae, but might belong to the Nymphalidae. Riodinella, yet another prehistoric genus, also seems to belong here, but its relationships are quite obscure, indeed. However, these fossils – all found in Eocene deposits dating roughly between 50 and 25 million years ago – suggest the radiation of the Papilionoidea into the present-day families took place during that epoch. Prodryas, from the end of the Eocene, can be quite robustly assigned to the Nymphalidae, and is quite likely a member of the Nymphalini. Oligocene fossils of Papilionoidea are usually assignable to an extant family without problems.

Taken together, these fossils place the origin of the Papilionoidea in the latest Mesozoic or early Paleogene, while the extant families emerged around the early Eocene onwards.

References

 
Butterflies
Lepidoptera superfamilies
Taxa named by Pierre André Latreille
Obtectomera

pl:Motyle dzienne